Channelsea River is a tidal river in London, England, one of the Bow Back Rivers that flow into the Bow Creek part of the River Lea, which in turn flows into the River Thames.

In 1957–8, the Channelsea River was culverted between Stratford High Street and Lett Road.

In 1994, the historian Dan Cruickshank found 4,000 tons (60%) of the lost Euston Arch buried in the bed of the River Lea at the Channelsea River and the Prescott Channel.

Channelsea Island is in this river.

See also
Rivers of the United Kingdom

References

External links
West Ham - Rivers, bridges, wharfs and docks | British History Online

Rivers of London